Jun Kanakubo (金久保 順, born July 26, 1987) is a Japanese football player who currently plays for Mito HollyHock.

Club statistics
Updated to 9 August 2022.

References

External links
Profile at Vegalta Sendai

1987 births
Living people
Ryutsu Keizai University alumni
Association football people from Ibaraki Prefecture
Japanese footballers
J1 League players
J2 League players
Omiya Ardija players
Avispa Fukuoka players
Kawasaki Frontale players
Vegalta Sendai players
Kyoto Sanga FC players
Association football midfielders